Iran is a unisex given name. People with the name include:

Female
Iran Darroudi (1936–2021), Iranian artist
Irán Castillo (born 1977), Mexican actress and singer 
Irán Eory (1939–2002), Spanish actress

Male
Iran Barkley (born 1960), American retired professional boxer
Iran Andrielle de Oliveira (born 1979), Brazilian football player

Unisex given names